The lists of Merriam-Webster's Words of the Year (for each year) are ten-word lists published annually by the American dictionary-publishing company Merriam-Webster, Inc., which feature the ten words of the year from the English language. These word lists started in 2003 and have been published at the end of each year. At first, Merriam-Webster determined its contents by analyzing page hits and popular searches on its website. Since 2006, the list has been determined by an online poll and by suggestions from visitors to the website.

The Words of the Year usually reflect events that happened during the years the lists were published. For example, the Word of the Year for 2005, 'integrity', showed that the general public had an immense interest in defining this word amid ethics scandals in the United States government, corporations, and sports. The Word of the Year for 2004, 'blog', was looked up on the Online Dictionary the most as blogs began to influence mainstream media. In 2006, Merriam-Webster received a lot of publicity as 'truthiness', a word coined by Stephen Colbert on The Colbert Report, topped the list.

Selection process
When the Word of the Year was started in 2003, Merriam-Webster determined which words would appear on the list by analyzing page hits and popular searches to its website. For example, the 2003 and 2004 lists were determined by online hits to the Merriam-Webster Online Dictionary and Online Thesaurus and to Merriam-WebsterCollegiate.com. In 2006 and 2007, Merriam-Webster changed this practice, and the list was determined by an online poll among words that were suggested by visitors to the site. Visitors were requested to vote for one entry out of a list of twenty words and phrases. The list consisted of the words and phrases that were frequently looked up on the site and those that were submitted by many readers. From 2008 onwards, however, user submissions have not been a deciding factor, and the list has been composed only of the words which were looked up most frequently that year. Merriam-Webster said that the reason for the change was that otherwise ordinary words were receiving so many hits that their significance could not be ignored.

Words of the Year

Full list by year

2003 

John Morse, president of Merriam-Webster, pointed out that "the most frequently looked up words are not the newest words, not the latest high-tech terms, not the cool new slang." Instead, these top ten words correlated to breaking news stories and world events in 2003. The top word democracy correlated to the invasion of Iraq and the overthrow of Saddam Hussein's regime, quarantine to a SARS epidemic, and matrix to the film The Matrix Revolutions.

2004 

In 2004, blogs were becoming highly popular and began to influence mainstream media. During the twelve-month period that decides the word of the year, the term blog had the most requests for a definition or explanation, so a new entry was placed in Merriam-Webster's printed dictionary for 2005. The other words on this list, such as incumbent, electoral, and partisan, were associated with major news events, such as the United States presidential election of 2004 or natural disasters that hit the US.

2005 

For 2005, integrity was the most looked-up word in Merriam-Webster's Online Dictionary. According to John Morse, President of Merriam-Webster, the word integrity slowly moved up the list to first place in 2005 because ethics scandals emerged around the United States regarding corporations, government, and sports, such as the CIA leak investigations, scandals in Congress, and disgraced athletes.

Hurricane Katrina, the bird flu, and the death of Pope John Paul II renewed public interest in words such as refugee, tsunami, pandemic, conclave, and levee. The word refugee was also a candidate for the American Dialect Society's Word of the Year; according to Morse, the term gained notoriety as the entire country debated with how to describe people affected by Hurricane Katrina. The debate, over whether refugee was the proper term to describe displaced residents or whether the term was pejorative, summoned several Americans to look up the word in their dictionaries to form their own opinion. The word refugee received more queries in one month than most words in an entire year. The word insipid made the Top 10 list after Simon Cowell described Anthony Fedorov's performance in American Idol as "pleasant, safe, and a little insipid." At number 10 is inept, a word that received a lot of attention after the days when President George W. Bush delivered a live prime time news conference that came to an awkward end when some television networks cut him off to return to their regularly scheduled programs.

2006 

After online visitors chose truthiness in a five-to-one majority vote as the Word of the Year of 2006, Merriam-Webster received a large amount of publicity. This was the first year in which Merriam-Webster used online voting to decide its Word of the Year. The term was created by Stephen Colbert on Comedy Central in The Colbert Report'''s first episode, which took place in October 2005, to describe things that he fervently believes to be the case regardless of the facts. In addition, truthiness became the American Dialect Society's Word of the Year for 2005.

 2007 

John Morse, President of Merriam-Webster, said that the word w00t was a good choice because it "blends whimsy and new technology". Spelled with two zeros in leetspeak, w00t reflects a new direction in the English language led by a generation raised on video games and cell phone text messaging. While the word itself has not been published in its printed dictionary yet, Merriam-Webster claims that its presence in the Open Dictionary and the honors it's been awarded gives w00t a better chance at becoming an official word. It originally became popular in online gaming forums and is now used as an expression of excitement and joy. The word is also considered an acronym in the online gaming world for the phrase We owned the other team. This word was also used in the 1990 film Pretty Woman when Julia Roberts exclaimed "Woot, woot, woot!" to her date's friends during a polo match.

Placing second in 2007's contest, facebook created an unofficial verb out of the website Facebook. Founded in 2004, Facebook is a social network that allows its users to create a profile page and forge links with other friends and acquaintances.

 2008 

 2009 

 2010 Austerity was the most searched-for word of 2010. Interest in the word reached its highest point around May 1, the day the Greek government announced a series of austerity measures, but its popularity remained strong throughout the year. Peter Sokolowski, Merriam-Webster editor-at-large, said: "Austerity clearly resonates with many people. We often hear it used in the context of government measures, but we also apply it to our own personal finances and what is sometimes called the new normal." Barack Obama used the word shellacking in November 2010, when acknowledging his party's losses in the US mid-term elections, and lookups of ebullient peaked in October, as thirty-three Chilean miners were successfully rescued after 69 days trapped underground.

 2011 

The word pragmatic was looked up on Merriam-Webster's website an unprecedented number of times in 2011. Although the popularity of the word wasn't linked to any specific event, it received the greatest amount of interest in the latter half of the year, as the United States Congress introduced the Budget Control Act, and its Supercommittee began to craft deficit-reduction plans. Ambivalence was also a popular word throughout the year; John Moore, President of Merriam-Webster, remarked: "We think it reflects the public attitude toward a wide range of issues, including the economy, the ongoing debates in Washington, the presidential election, and most recently the race for the Republican Party nomination." The term vitriol was used frequently in the wake of the January 2011 Tucson shooting, which led to a national debate about political rhetoric.

In November 2011, political commentator David Gergen rounded off a CNN article (entitled "Have they gone nuts in Washington?") with the phrase "après moi, le déluge". The expression, attributed to Louis XV, typifies the attitude of those who don't care about the future, because they won't be around to face the consequences of their actions.

 2012 

The popularity of many of the words on Merriam-Webster's 2012 list were influenced by the commentary and debate that surrounded that year's US presidential election. Socialism and capitalism were frequently referred to during the party conventions and the televised debates; interest in socialism spiked on the day of the election – November 6, 2012. The word malarkey was used several times by Joe Biden during his vice-presidential debate with Paul Ryan on October 11, and meme captured the public imagination after a remark made by Mitt Romney about "binders full of women", on October 16, went viral.Touché remained a popular word throughout the year. This was partly as a result of a new technology of the same name being announced by Disney Research; however, John Morse, President of Merriam-Webster, suggested that touché was "simply a word enjoying a period of increased popular use, perhaps as a byproduct of the growing amount of verbal jousting in our culture, especially through social media".

 2013 

The popularity of the word science in 2013 was driven by debates around climate change and science in education.  Further debates around pseudoscience and whether science can answer all of life's questions further drove its popularity.

Cognitive's popularity was principally driven by ongoing issues with relation to concussion in American professional sports.  The popularity of rapport and communication was principally driven by Edward Snowden's revelations around the NSA's global surveillance.

 2014 

 2015 

The suffix -ism goes all the way back to Ancient Greek, and was used in Latin and medieval French on its way to English. Originally, it turned a verb into a noun: think of baptize and baptism, criticize and criticism, or plagiarize and plagiarism. It has since acquired many other uses, including identifying a religion or practice (Calvinism, vegetarianism), a prejudice based on a specific quality (sexism, ageism), an adherence to a system (stoicism, altruism), a condition based on excess of something (alcoholism), or a characteristic feature or trait (colloquialism).

 2016 

 2017 

 2018 

 2019 

Searches for they increased by 313% in 2019 over 2018; the use of they to refer to one person whose gender identity is nonbinary was added to the Merriam-Webster.com dictionary in September 2019. Quid pro quo is most often used in legal texts, and interest in the term is primarily attributed to the Trump–Ukraine scandal. Interest in crawdad is attributed to the novel Where the Crawdads Sing by Delia Owens. A Boeing pilot used egregious in describing an issue with the Boeing 737 MAX groundings. The Ohio State University tried to patent the word The. Attorney General William Barr used snitty to describe the Mueller Report; Merriam-Webster describes the word as "a child of the 1970s." On January 23, The Washington Post columnist George Will wrote, "During the government shutdown, Graham’s tergiversations—sorry, this is the precise word—have amazed." A fashion exhibit at The Met sparked interest in camp. 2020 Pandemic, coronavirus, quarantine, and asymptomatic are all in reference to the ongoing COVID-19 pandemic. Amid the George Floyd protests of May 2020 and beyond, many Black Lives Matter supporters called on local governments to "defund the police", leading defund to have a 6,059% increase in lookups from 2019 to 2020; ensuing national conversations about references to the American Civil War led to the country music trio formerly known as Lady Antebellum changing their name to Lady A, ensuing a similar 885% increase in lookups. Mamba and kraken are both sports references, to "The Black Mamba" Kobe Bryant who died in January 2020 and the expansion National Hockey League franchise Seattle Kraken, respectively. Actress Jamie Lee Curtis Tweeted in July 2020 that Merriam-Webster had recently added irregardless, a double negative, to the dictionary, although the dictionary had entered it in 1934. A frequent entry in victorious US Presidential candidate Joe Biden's vocabulary, malarkey'' saw its second appearance in the top 10, the other being in 2012 during his re-election campaign for Vice President.

References

External links
 Merriam-Webster Online

Lists of English words
Top lists